Serin George is an Indian model, photographer and a digital creator.

Education
George completed her schooling in Vizag, Kerala and her undergraduate degree at Amal Jyothi College of Engineering in Kottayam. She holds a BTech Degree in Computer Science.

Career
George has worked as a model. In 2007 she participated and won the Navy Queen title, held at the Southern Naval Command in Kochi.

She is also a fitness enthusiast

References

Indian women photographers
Indian fashion photographers
Female models from Bangalore
Living people
Artists from Visakhapatnam
Year of birth missing (living people)
21st-century Indian photographers
Female models from Andhra Pradesh
Photographers from Andhra Pradesh
21st-century women photographers